Mimi of Nachtigal, or Mimi-N, is a language of Chad that is attested only in a word list labelled "Mimi" that was collected ca. 1870 by Gustav Nachtigal. Nachtigal's data was subsequently published by Lukas & Voelckers (1938).

Classification
Joseph Greenberg (1960) classified it as a Maban language, though a distant one. Subsequent researchers have supported a remote relationship, though there is little data to go on.

Basic vocabulary
The more stable of Mimi-N and Mimi-D's attested vocabulary is as follows:

See also 

 Mimi of Decorse
 Mimi of Nachtigal word list (Wiktionary)

References

Maban languages
Languages of Chad
Languages attested from the 1870s
Extinct languages of Africa